Invitation is the debut album by alternative rock supergroup Filthy Friends; it was released on Kill Rock Stars in 2017.

Reception
Stephen Thomas Erlewine of AllMusic awarded the album four out of five stars, writing, "It's as fun as it's galvanizing, a record that draws strength from its casual nature." Pitchforks Alfred Soto gave the album a 6.5 out of 10, praising the performance but noting that the music, "depends on its lack of surprise... It is a good time, and not much more."

Track listing
All songs written by Peter Buck and Corin Tucker
"Despierta" – 4:19
"Windmill" – 3:56
"Faded Afternoon" – 3:19
"Any Kind of Crowd" – 3:15
"Second Life" – 2:38
"The Arrival" – 2:19
"Come Back Shelley" – 3:59
"No Forgotten Son" – 3:13
"Brother" – 3:43
"You and Your King" – 3:10
"Makers" – 2:22
"Invitation" – 2:34

Personnel

Filthy Friends
Kurt Bloch – guitar, cover design, production
Peter Buck – guitar production
Scott McCaughey – bass guitar, keyboards, backing vocals, production
Krist Novoselic – bass guitar, production
Bill Rieflin – drums, percussion, mixing, production
Corin Tucker – vocals, production

Technical personnel
Ed Brooks – digital mastering
Don Gunn – mixing, percussion
Adam Seizer – engineering
Francesca Sundsten – cover art

References

External links

2017 debut albums
Filthy Friends albums
Kill Rock Stars albums